Adam Luke Docker (born 17 November 1985) is an English former footballer who is now a restaurateur. In 2007, Docker was called up for Pakistan, where he used the name of Adam Karim.

Club career
Born to an Asian father and English mother, Karim began his professional football career with Bury, later joining Altrincham for a few months but then joined Bangor City in the 2005–06 season. He was released at the end of the 2006–07 season despite being a fairly impressive performer. He later joined Chorley, but in September 2007 linked up again with his former Bangor manager Clayton Blackmore when he joined Porthmadog. At the same time, he was also playing for Rochdale club Asia F.C.

Docker parted company with Porthmadog in 2008. In late 2009 he was playing for Canaries FC in the Lancashire Evening Post Sunday football league and captained them to victory in the Asian Community Cup final held at Stamford Bridge.

In February 2010, Docker joined Salford City but after a short period asked to be released and subsequently joined FC United of Manchester. He played one match for the club, coming on as a substitute.  He later joined Chadderton in November 2010, scoring in the one and only match he played for the club. Docker then joined Ashton United in November 2010., playing 3 games in February 2011.

International call-up
In October 2007, Docker was called up by Pakistan. He was an unused substitute in a 2010 FIFA World Cup group play-off match against Iraq.

Personal life

In July 2017 he married Russian TV presenter Olga Ushakova in Cyprus, who has daughters from a previous relationship in addition to two daughters she and Docker have together, born in 2018 and 2020.

Docker runs a restaurant in Manchester.

References

External links
FCUM Old Boys player profile
Welsh Prem record 

1985 births
Living people
Footballers from Rochdale
English footballers
Pakistani footballers
English people of Pakistani descent
Association football fullbacks
Bury F.C. players
Altrincham F.C. players
Bangor City F.C. players
Chorley F.C. players
F.C. United of Manchester players
Salford City F.C. players
Ashton United F.C. players
Chadderton F.C. players
British Asian footballers
British sportspeople of Pakistani descent